Ana Mirela Țermure (born 13 January 1975 in Căianu Mic, Bistrița-Năsăud County) is a retired javelin thrower from Romania. Termure's personal best was 65.08 metres in Bucharest on June 10, 2001.

She tested positive for norandrosterone at the 2001 IAAF World Championships and received a two-year doping ban.

International competitions

References

External links

 

1975 births
Living people
People from Bistrița-Năsăud County
Romanian female javelin throwers
Olympic athletes of Romania
Athletes (track and field) at the 2000 Summer Olympics
World Athletics Championships athletes for Romania
Romanian sportspeople in doping cases
Doping cases in athletics
Competitors at the 1999 Summer Universiade